Mike Holland (born 1970) is a Canadian politician, who was elected to the Legislative Assembly of New Brunswick in the 2018 election. He represents the electoral district of Albert as a member of the Progressive Conservative Party of New Brunswick.

Holland was appointed Minister of Natural Resources and Energy Development in November 2018 and reappointed to the position after the NB general election of 2020.

Holland has served on the Provincial Treasury Board as well as the Provincial Policy and Priority Board

Holland was re-elected in the 2020 provincial election.

Holland has argued that New Brunswick cannot meet the Canadian federal deadline for phasing out the use of coal for electricity by 2030, which is an international commitment that Canada has made as part of its Nationally Determined Contribution to the Paris Agreement as part of the Pan-Canadian Framework.

In 2020 Holland was awarded with the Canadian Wildlife Federation's "Past President's Canadian Legislator Award".
This award is presented annually to an elected official, territorial, or federal legislators in recognition of a significant contribution to the conservation of wildlife in Canada.

In 2020 Holland received the "Sportsman of the Year" award from the New Brunswick Wildlife Federation for his work that doubled the protected areas in New Brunswick.

Election results

References

Living people
Progressive Conservative Party of New Brunswick MLAs
21st-century Canadian politicians
Members of the Executive Council of New Brunswick
1970 births